Tirmen (Tirmän) is a rural locality (a village) in Askarovsky Selsoviet, Abzelilovsky District, Bashkortostan, Russia. The population was 13 as of 2010. There are 2 streets.

Geography 
Tirmen is located 14 km southwest of Askarovo (the district's administrative centre) by road. Kulukasovo is the nearest rural locality.

References 

Rural localities in Abzelilovsky District